Mississippi Highway 371 (MS 371) is a  state highway in northeastern Mississippi running from MS 6 near Amory to MS 4 near New Site. The highway has been in existence since 1950 but it has followed its current alignment since 1965.

Route description
The two-lane highway heads north through mostly wooded area of northern Monroe County. At the community of Cason, MS 371 intersects MS 776, the unsigned former alignment of MS 6. The highway heads into Itawamba County, where it continues north through more wooded areas. At the community of Evergreen, MS 371 curves to the northwest, crosses into Lee County and turns back to the north in the community of Richmond. Through this area, agricultural fields begin to surround the road. MS 371 reaches the community of Mooreville at a four-way stop controlled intersection with MS 178.

North of this intersection, MS 371 makes a sweeping s-curve to reach an interchange with Interstate 22 (I-22) and U.S. Route 78 (US 78). The interchange, exit 94 along I-22, is a simple diamond interchange. Through the interchange, MS 371 is briefly a four-lane divided highway. The state highway continues towards the east, back into Itawamba County, towards the town of Mantachie, one of two incorporated towns through which MS 371 travels. MS 371 heads southwest-northeast through the town on Main Street passing through the main commercial district of the town. Towards the east side of town, MS 371 intersects MS 363. Continuing north, the highway passes in front of Mantachie High School. As it exits the town, MS 371 crosses Twentymile Creek and heads through the census designated place of Kirkville. Between the two interchanges, MS 371 also intersects MS 370 at its eastern terminus.

Continuing north, MS 371 enters Prentiss County. It soon enters the town of Marietta. Through Marietta, the highway only passes a few homes and businesses. Near the center of town, it reaches the eastern terminus of MS 366 and western terminus of County Road 4050 (CR 4050) at a four-way stop. MS 371 heads north, passing the town hall before traveling through unincorporated areas again. At the settlement known as Hobo Station, MS 371 ends at an intersection with MS 4 adjacent to a gas station and general store.

History
MS 371 first appeared on the Mississippi state map in the 1950 edition connecting Cason at MS 6 and Mooreville at US 78. However, a state-maintained road connecting the two communities had existed since 1940. A second segment of MS 371 was designated in 1956, running from Mantachie to US 45 in the Saltillo vicinity, generally following the route of MS 363. Also around this time, MS 363 followed the current routing of MS 371 from Mantachie to MS 4. By 1958, the two segments of the route were connected along an unpaved road from Mooreville to Mantachie. In 1960, a slight extension of the route was made at its southern end. A swap of highways 363 and 371 north of Mantachie occurred between 1964 and 1965. MS 371 has remained on this alignment since then.

Major intersections

References

External links

371
Transportation in Monroe County, Mississippi
Transportation in Itawamba County, Mississippi
Transportation in Lee County, Mississippi
Transportation in Prentiss County, Mississippi